Minister of Commerce and Industry could refer to:

Minister of Commerce and Industries (Afghanistan)
Minister of Commerce and Industry (France)
Minister of Commerce and Industry (India)

See also
Ministry of Commerce and Industry (disambiguation)